The 2005 UEFA Women's Cup Final was a two-legged final match played on 15 and 21 May 2005 between Djurgårdens of Sweden and Turbine Potsdam of Germany. Turbine Potsdam won the final 5–1 on aggregate.

Match details

First leg

Second leg

Women's Cup
Uefa Women's Cup Final 2005
Uefa Women's Cup Final 2005
2005
UEFA
UEFA
UEFA
May 2005 sports events in Europe
2000s in Stockholm
Football in Stockholm